Ze (З з; italics: З з) is a letter of the Cyrillic script.

Ze is romanized using the Latin letter .

The shape of Ze is very similar to the Arabic numeral three , and should not be confused with the Cyrillic letter E .

History and shape

Ze is derived from the Greek letter Zeta (Ζ ζ).

The shape of the letter originally looked similar to a Greek letter Ζ or Latin letter Z with a tail on the bottom. Though a majuscule form of this variant is encoded in Unicode, historically it was only used as caseless or lowercase.

In the Cyrillic numeral system, Zemlja had a value of 7.

Only the form  was used in the oldest ustav (uncial) writing style; з appeared in the later poluustav (half-uncial) manuscripts and typescripts, where the two variants are found at proportions of about 1:1. Some early grammars tried to give a phonetic distinction to these forms (like palatalized vs. nonpalatalized sound), but the system had no further development. Ukrainian scribes and typographers began to regularly use З/з in an initial position, and  otherwise (a system in use till the end of the 19th century). Russian scribes and typographers largely abandoned the widespread use of the variant  in favor of з in the wake of Patriarch Nikon's reforms. They still used the older form mostly in the case of two З's in row:  (the system in use till the mid-18th century).

The civil (Petrine) script knows only one shape of the letter: З/з. However, shapes similar to Z/z can be used in certain stylish typefaces.

In calligraphy and in general handwritten text, lowercase з can be written either fully over the baseline (similar to the printed form) or with the lower half under the baseline and with the loop (for the Russian language, a standard shape since the middle of the 20th century).

Phonetic value
The letter Ze may represent:
 , the voiced alveolar sibilant (Macedonian, Bulgarian, Bosnian, Serbian, Montenegrin, Russian, Ukrainian, Rusyn and Belarusian);
 , the voiceless alveolar sibilant (in final position or before voiceless consonants);
 cluster  can be pronounced (mostly in Ukrainian, Rusyn and Belarusian) as the voiced alveolar affricate  (Ukrainian дзеркало “mirror”) or its palatalized form  (Belarusian гадзіннік “clock”), but if  and  belong to different morphemes, then they are pronounced separately.
 , the voiceless alveolar affricate in Mongolian.

З-shaped Latin letters

Zhuang
A letter that looks like Cyrillic Ze (actually, a stylization of digit 3) was used in the Latin Zhuang alphabet from 1957 to 1986 to represent the third (high) tone.

Other related letters and similar characters
3 : Digit Three
Ζ ζ : Greek letter Zeta
Z z : Latin letter Z
Ʒ ʒ : Latin letter Ezh
Ȝ ȝ : Latin letter Yogh
Ɜ ɜ : Latin letter reversed open E
Ҙ ҙ : Cyrillic letter Dhe or Ze with descender
Ӡ ӡ : Cyrillic letter Abkhazian Dze
Ԑ ԑ : Cyrillic letter Reversed Ze

Computing codes

External links

References